Cindy Pieters (born 24 January 1976 in Veurne, Belgium) is a professional racing cyclist, who specialized in one day races She competed in the women's individual road race at the 2000 Summer Olympics.

Palmarès

1999
1st  Belgian National Road Race Championships
3rd La Flèche Wallonne Féminine

2001
3rd Belgian National Time Trial Championships

2002
1st  Belgian National Time Trial Championships

2006
2nd Belgian National Time Trial Championships

References

1976 births
Living people
People from Veurne
Belgian female cyclists
Cyclists from West Flanders
Olympic cyclists of Belgium
Cyclists at the 2000 Summer Olympics